FCI Levadia Tallinn women's team are an Estonian women's football team based in Tallinn, Estonia, that competes in the Naiste Meistriliiga, the top flight of Estonian women's football.

The team was founded in 1993 as TKSK. In 2002, they became the first Estonian team to compete in the UEFA Women's Cup. In 2006, the team became affiliated with Levadia. The team has won nine Naiste Meistriliiga and two Estonian Women's Cup trophies.

Honours

Domestic
 Naiste Meistriliiga
 Winners (9): 1997–98, 1999, 1999, 2000, 2001, 2002, 2007, 2008, 2009

 Estonian Women's Cup
 Winners (2): 2009, 2016

Regional
 Women's Baltic League
 Winners: 2007

Players

First-team squad

Record in UEFA competitions
All results (home, away and aggregate) list Levadia's goal tally first.

References

External links
Official website 

Women's football clubs in Estonia
Women
Association football clubs established in 1993
Football clubs in Tallinn
1993 establishments in Estonia